A Girl in Black is a 1956 Greek dramatic film by the Cypriot director Michael Cacoyannis starring Dimitris Horn and Ellie Lambeti. The film takes place on the Greek island of Hydra, where two Athenian visitors become entangled in local feuds after one of them falls in love with a local girl.

It was one of the first Greek films to achieve international recognition (Golden Globe award).

Cast
Ellie Lambeti as Marina
Dimitris Horn as Pavlos
Giorgos Foundas as Hristos
Eleni Zafeiriou as Froso
Stephanos Stratigos as Panagis
Notis Peryalis as Antonis
Anestis Vlahos	as Mitsos
Thanassis Veggos as policeman
Nikos Fermas as Aristeidis

Awards
The film was among the six Best Foreign Language Film award winners of the 14th Golden Globe Awards. It was also nominated for a Golden Palm Award at the 1956 Cannes Film Festival.

References

External links 
 

1956 films
1956 drama films
Films directed by Michael Cacoyannis
Greek drama films
Films shot in Hydra
1950s Greek-language films
Greek black-and-white films